Petar Petrov Zhekov (10 October 1944 – 18 February 2023) was a Bulgarian footballer, widely regarded as one of the best forwards in the history of the Bulgarian football. He won the silver medal at the 1968 Summer Olympics.

Zhekov was born in Knizhovnik, Haskovo Province, and began his career at F.C. Dimitrovgrad. He was initially deployed as a defender, but on the advice of manager Hristo Hadzhiev switched to the forward position. Later he moved to Beroe Stara Zagora, where he twice became Bulgaria's top goalscorer. Between 1968 and 1975 Zhekov played for CSKA Sofia and scored 144 goals for the team. This makes him the club's best goalscorer of all time. He also won the European Golden Boot in 1969 and two European Bronze Boots. He had 333 appearances and a record of 253 goals in the Bulgarian A Group.

Zhekov later coached PFC Hebar Pazardzhik. He died on 18 February 2023, at the age of 78.

Career statistics

Honours
CSKA Sofia
 Bulgarian League: 1968–69, 1970–71, 1971–72, 1972–73, 1974–75
 Bulgarian Cup: 1969, 1972, 1973, 1974

Individual
 European Golden Boot: 1969
 Bulgarian League top scorer (6): 1967, 1968, 1969, 1970, 1972, 1973

References

1944 births
2023 deaths
Bulgarian footballers
Bulgaria international footballers
Olympic silver medalists for Bulgaria
Olympic footballers of Bulgaria
Footballers at the 1968 Summer Olympics
Medalists at the 1968 Summer Olympics
FC Dimitrovgrad players
PFC Beroe Stara Zagora players
PFC CSKA Sofia players
First Professional Football League (Bulgaria) players
1966 FIFA World Cup players
1970 FIFA World Cup players
People from Dimitrovgrad, Bulgaria
Olympic medalists in football
Bulgarian football managers
PFC Hebar Pazardzhik managers
OFC Vihren Sandanski managers
Association football forwards
Sportspeople from Haskovo Province